DYAC-TV channel 23, was the flagship station of Philippine all-sports and action television network ABS-CBN Sports and Action (S+A), a fully owned subsidiary of AMCARA Broadcasting Network. Its transmitter and broadcast facilities are located at Mt. Busay, Brgy. Babag 1, Cebu City.

Digital television

Digital channels

UHF Channel 37 (611.143 MHz)

UHF Channel 36 (605.143 MHz)

Note:
CINEMO!, YEY!, Knowledge Channel, DZMM TeleRadyo and KBO Channel, are exclusive channels to TV Plus, a digital set-top box manufactured by the network.

See also
ABS-CBN
ABS-CBN Sports and Action
DYCB-TV
MOR 97.1
DYAB
Studio 23 (the former name of ABS-CBN Sports and Action)
ABS-CBN Sports and Action stations

ABS-CBN Sports and Action stations
Television stations in Cebu City
Television channels and stations established in 1992